

Toll bridges
Laredo- Juarez-Lincoln International Bridge
Laredo- Gateway to the Americas International Bridge
Laredo- Colombia-Solidarity International Bridge
Laredo- World Trade International Bridge
Mountain Creek Lake Bridge
Sam Houston Ship Channel Bridge
San Luis Pass-Vacek Toll Bridge
Gateway Bridge
B and M Bridge
Free Trade Bridge
Veterans International Bridge
B and P Bridge
Pharr-Reynosa Bridge
McAllen-Hidalgo-Reynosa Bridge
Rio Grande City-Camargo Bridge
Roma-Ciudad Miguel Aleman Bridge
Eagle Pass Bridge #1
Eagle Pass Bridge #2
Del Rio-Ciudad Acuna International Bridge
La Linda Bridge
Presidio Bridge
Ysleta-Zaragosa Bridge
Good Neighbor Bridge
Paso Del Norte Bridge

Toll tunnels
Addison Airport Toll Tunnel

Toll ferries
Los Ebanos Ferry